Sisa is a psychoactive drug from Greece. The basic ingredient is methamphetamine, with additives such as battery acid, engine oil, shampoo and salt. It's notably abused by many homeless people in Athens, and causes dangerous side effects such as insomnia, delusions, heart attacks, and violent tendencies. Routes of administration include smoking, snorting, and intravenous injection.

See also 
 Flashblood
 Changaa
 Jenkem
 Whoonga
 Ya ba

References 

Psychoactive drugs